Todd Woodbridge and Mark Woodforde defeated Sébastien Lareau and Alex O'Brien in the final, 6–4, 5–7, 6–2, 7–6(7–3) to win the doubles tennis title at the 1996 ATP Tour World Championships. It was the Woodies' second Tour Finals title.

Grant Connell and Patrick Galbraith were the reigning champions, but only Connell competed that year partnering Byron Black; they were defeated in the semifinals by Woodbridge and Woodforde.

Seeds
Champion seeds are indicated in bold text while text in italics indicates the round in which those seeds were eliminated.

Draw

Finals

Green group
Standings are determined by: 1. number of wins; 2. number of matches; 3. in two-players-ties, head-to-head records; 4. in three-players-ties, percentage of sets won, or of games won; 5. steering-committee decision.

Yellow group
Standings are determined by: 1. number of wins; 2. number of matches; 3. in two-players-ties, head-to-head records; 4. in three-players-ties, percentage of sets won, or of games won; 5. steering-committee decision.

External links
 1996 ATP Tour World Doubles Championships Round robin Draw (Green Group)
 1996 ATP Tour World Doubles Championships Round robin Draw (Yellow Group)
 1996 ATP Tour World Doubles Championships Finals Draw

Doubles
ATP Tour World Championships – Doubles
Tennis tournaments in the United States
Sports in Hartford, Connecticut
Sports competitions in Hartford, Connecticut